Schipborg is a village in the Dutch province of Drenthe. It is a part of the municipality of Aa en Hunze, and lies about 11 km northeast of Assen.

The village was first mentioned between 1298 and 1304 as Borc, and is a combination of a tree (probably a birch) and ship.

Schipborg was home to 84 people in 1840.

Gallery

References

Populated places in Drenthe
Aa en Hunze